Vigo di Fassa (or Vig im Fasstal) is a frazione of Sèn Jan di Fassa in Trentino in the northern Italian region Trentino-Alto Adige/Südtirol, located about  northeast of Trento.

 
In the census of 2001, 921 inhabitants out of 1,073 (85.8%) declared Ladin as their native language.

References

Cities and towns in Trentino-Alto Adige/Südtirol